This is a list of players who have captained a winning team to the All-Ireland Senior Football Championship, the premier competition in Gaelic football. The All-Ireland Senior Football Championship is an annual series of games usually played in Ireland during the summer and early autumn, and organised by the Gaelic Athletic Association (GAA). Contested by the top inter-county football teams in Ireland, the tournament has taken place every year since 1887—except in 1888, when the competition was not played due to a tour of the United States by would-be competitors.

List of winning captains

List of players who have captained their team to All-Ireland success on more than one occasion
A select number of players have captained their team to All-Ireland success on more than one occasion.

See also
 Sam Maguire Cup
 List of All-Ireland Senior Hurling Championship winning captains

References

Captains